Don Mueang International Airport (or colloquially as)  is one of two international airports serving the Bangkok Metropolitan Region, the other one being Suvarnabhumi Airport (BKK). Before Suvarnabhumi opened in 2006, Don Mueang was previously known as Bangkok International Airport.

The airport is considered to be one of the world's oldest international airports and Asia's oldest operating airport. It was officially opened as a Royal Thai Air Force base on 27 March 1914, although it had been in use earlier. Commercial flights began in 1924, making it one of the world's oldest commercial airports. The airport consists of Terminal 1 for international flights and Terminal 2 for domestic flights which are connected by a unique glass exterior elevated walkway. The airport also featured an exterior walkway connected to the Amari hotel. The first commercial flight was an arrival by KLM Royal Dutch Airlines.

In September 2006, Don Mueang Airport was closed and replaced by the newly opened Suvarnabhumi Airport, before reopening on 24 March 2007 after renovations. Since the opening of the new airport, it has become a regional commuter flight hub and the de facto low-cost airline hub. In 2015, it became the world's largest low cost carrier airport.

Don Mueang previously carried the IATA code BKK, which was subsequently reassigned to Suvarnabhumi, and was an important hub of Asia and the hub of Thai Airways International prior to its closure. At its peak, it served most air traffic for the entire country, with 80 airlines operating 160,000 flights and handling over 38 million passengers and 700,000 tons of cargo in 2004. It was then the 14th busiest airport in the world and 2nd in Asia by passenger volume. Currently, Don Mueang is the main operating base for Nok Air, Thai AirAsia and Thai Lion Air.

History

"Don Mueang" airfield was the second established in Thailand, after Sa Pathum airfield, which is now Sa Pathum horse racing course, known as the Royal Bangkok Sports Club. The first flights to Don Mueang were made on 8 March 1914 and involved the transfer of aircraft of the Royal Thai Air Force.  Three years earlier, Thailand had sent three army officers to France to train as pilots. On completion of their training in 1911, the pilots were authorized to purchase eight aircraft, four Breguets and four Nieuports, which formed the basis of the Royal Thai Air Force. Sa Pathum airfield was established in February 1911 with an arrival by Orville Wright, seven years after the invention of the first airplane by the Wright brothers on 17 December 1903.

In 1933, the airfield was the scene of heavy fighting between royalists and government forces during the Boworadet Rebellion. The airfield was used by the occupying Japanese during World War II, and was bombed and strafed by Allied aircraft on several occasions.

After the war had finished in September 1945, the airfield was occupied by the RAF during the brief British occupation of Thailand until March 1946 when 211 Squadron, which moved there in October 1945, was disbanded.

During the Vietnam War, Don Mueang was a major command and logistics hub of the United States Air Force. 

In May 2005, Thai Airways International introduced nonstop services between Bangkok and New York City (JFK Airport) using Airbus A340-500s; it operated from Suvarnabhumi Airport from September 2006, and continued to do so until Thai ended its New York service in 2008.

On 7 September 2022 at 21:50, an Airbus A380-800 of Emirates (registered A6-EUJ) made an emergency landing on runway 21R at Don Mueang.  The aircraft operated as flight EK 363, originated at Guangzhou, China, had been banking over Suvarnabhumi Airport for more than 50 minutes, was unable to land due to heavy rain, even though the latter has been Thailand's port-of-entry since its inauguration 16 years earlier (and the only airport in Thailand that is A380-compatible, even on a scheduled basis during peak times).  During its diversion, all passengers and crew remained on board (to wait for the rain to stop); the plane refueled and then took off from Don Mueang at 01:08 the next morning, on 8 September, and landed at Suvarnabhumi where passengers disembarked (the arrival at Suvarnabhumi was delayed).  Furthermore, Emirates became the first full-service intercontinental carrier to touch down at Don Mueang for the first time since 2006; the Airbus A380 made its first visit into Don Mueang for the first time in history.

Closure
The night of 27–28 September 2006 was the official end of operations at Don Mueang airport. The last commercial flights were:
 International departure: Although scheduled for Kuwait Airways KU414 to Kuwait at 02:50, Qantas flight QF302 to Sydney, originally scheduled for 18:00, was delayed for more than nine hours before finally taking off at 03:12, about ten minutes after the Kuwait flight. Qantas claimed that QF302 was an extra flight.
 International arrival: Kuwait Airways from Jakarta at 01:30
 Domestic departure: Thai Airways TG124 to Chiang Mai at 22:15 (coincidentally, when Thai moved domestic operations back to Don Mueang again on 28 March 2009, their last departure was also a 22:15 flight to Chiang Mai)
 Domestic arrival: TG216 from Phuket at 23:00

Before the opening of Suvarnabhumi, the airport used the IATA airport code BKK and the name was spelled "Don Muang". After Suvarnabhumi opened for commercial flights, the spelling was changed and as "Don Mueang" it now uses the airport code DMK, though it still retains the ICAO airport code VTBD. The traditional spelling is still used by many airlines and by most Thais.

Reopening

Commercial carriers deserted Don Mueang at the opening of Suvarnabhumi Airport. But the higher operating costs of the new airport and safety concerns over cracked runways at the new airport caused many to seek a return to Don Mueang. Low-cost airlines led demands for a reopening of the airport. Airports of Thailand released a report at the end of 2006 which furthered this effort. The report proposed reopening DMK as a way to avoid or delay second-stage expansion which had been planned for Suvarnabhumi.

On 30 January 2007, the Ministry of Transport recommended temporarily reopening Don Mueang while touch up work proceeded on some taxiways at Suvarnabhumi. The recommendation was subject to approval by the Thai cabinet. On 25 March 2007, the airport officially reopened for some domestic flights.

Because of the 2011 Thailand floods that affected Bangkok and other parts of Thailand, the airport was closed as flood waters flowed onto the runways and affected the lighting. Don Mueang reopened on 6 March 2012.

On 16 March 2012, the Government of Thailand under Prime Minister Yingluck Shinawatra ordered all low-cost, chartered, and non-connecting flights to relocate to Don Mueang.  This ended the single-airport policy. Airports of Thailand was ordered to encourage low-cost carriers to shift to Don Mueang to help ease congestion at Suvarnabhumi Airport. Suvarnabhumi Airport was designed to handle 45 million passengers per year, but it processed 48 million in 2011 and the number was expected to reach 53 million in 2012. Some ten airlines may relocate to Don Mueang. Budget airline Nok Air is already serving flights from and to Don Mueang. Nok Air handles about four million passengers per year. Orient Thai Airlines and Thai AirAsia have also started operations at Don Mueang. Thai AirAsia carried 7.2 million passengers in 2011. The number is projected to grow to eight million in 2012.

Expansion
Currently, Terminal 1 is capable of handling 18.5 million passengers annually. On 7 September 2013, Airports of Thailand announced its three billion baht renovation to reopen Terminal 2 as early as May 2014. Terminal 1's passengers in 2013 will likely reach 16 million against its capacity of 18.5 million. Completion of Terminal 2 in December 2015 increases Don Mueang's passenger capacity to 30 million a year.

The third phase of Don Mueang's 38 billion baht expansion will be completed sometime in the future. It aims to increase the airport's passenger capacity to 48 million per year. The new  international Terminal 3 will accommodate 18 million passengers a year by 2022.

Terminals
Don Mueang International Airport has three terminals. Terminal 1 is used for international flights and Terminal 2 for domestic flights. The opening of Terminal 2 has raised the airport's capacity to 30 million passengers per year. Terminal 3, the old domestic terminal, has been abandoned since 2011. In a third phase of airport expansion, a new Terminal 3 is in the planning stages , with construction projected to begin sometime between 2020–2025. The new terminal will have a capacity of 18 million passengers yearly. As part of the 39 billion baht project, Terminals 1 and 2 will be upgraded to handle 22 million domestic passengers annually, raising overall airport capacity from 30 to 40 million annually.

Airlines and destinations

Statistics
In 2019, the airport reached its full capacity of 52 flights per hour, or about 700–800 flights per day. By the end of 2019, it is expected to top its maximum passenger handling capacity of 40 million. Airport manager AoT forecasts 41 million passengers in 2020 and 45 million by 2023. The airport was designed to serve a maximum of 30 million passengers annually. Building additional runways is not possible. AoT is encouraging airlines to use wide-body aircraft at Don Mueang to increase passenger loads from 100–200 passengers to about 300 per aircraft.

Passenger figures

Total passenger traffic through Don Mueang jumped 40.7 percent to 30.3 million in 2015, with international numbers rising 53.1 percent to 9.17 million and domestic passengers increasing 35.9 percent to 21.1 million. Aircraft movements rose by 29.8 percent to 224,074, including 158,804 domestic (up 26.2 percent) and 65,270 international (up 39.3 percent).

Busiest domestic routes 2019

Busiest international routes 2019

Other facilities 
 The following companies had head offices on the airport property, before ceasing operations: Siam Air and R Airlines
 Don Mueang International Airport is a joint-use facility, shared with the Royal Thai Air Force's (RTAF) Don Muang Royal Thai Air Force Base, and is the home of the RTAF 1st Air Division, which consists primarily of non-combat aircraft.
 A RTAF golf course is located between the two runways. The course has no separation from the runway, and golfers are held back by a red light whenever planes land.

Accidents and incidents
 On 25 December 1976 – EgyptAir Flight 864, a Boeing 707-300 bound for Bangkok from Cairo, crashed into an industrial area near the airport during a landing attempt. All 53 aboard were killed.
 On 27 April 1980 – Thai Airways Flight 231, a BAe 748 which was en route from Khon Kaen to Bangkok, lost altitude during a thunderstorm and crashed about 13 km from Bangkok International Airport. All four crew members and 40 of the 49 passengers were killed.
 On 1 April 1981 – Indonesian Special Forces (Kopassus) raided hijacked Garuda Indonesia Flight 206 which was en route from Palembang to Polonia Airport (hijacked in Indonesian airspace). All 48 passengers safe, seven fatalities (one commando, one co-pilot, five terrorists). Imran bin Muhammad Zein, hijacker leader, captured.
 On 9 September 1988 – Vietnam Airlines Flight 831 crashed while on approach to Don Mueang International Airport. 76 of the 90 passengers and crew on board were killed.
 On 26 May 1991 – Lauda Air Flight 004, a Boeing 767-300ER (registered OE-LAV, named Mozart) which was headed to Vienna, suffered an in-flight deployment of the thrust reverser on the No. 1 engine after taking off from Don Mueang. There were no survivors from the 213 passengers and 10 crew.
 On 21 January 1992 – Douglas VC-47D L2-41/15/210 of the Royal Thai Air Force was damaged beyond repair in a landing accident.
 On 23 September 1999 – Qantas Flight 1, in what was then the most serious incident in the airline's famously safe jet aircraft history, a Boeing 747-400 overshot the runway causing significant damage but no casualties.
 On 3 March 2001 – Thai Airways International Flight 114, a Boeing 737-400 (registered HS-TDC, named Narathiwat), bound for Chiang Mai from Bangkok, was destroyed by an explosion and fire that occurred about 35 minutes before Thaksin Shinawatra, later to become Prime Minister of Thailand, and about 150 other passengers were to board. Five members of the cabin crew were aboard, and one was killed. Witnesses said they heard an explosion before flames erupted aboard the aircraft. Subsequently, NTSB investigators reported that the central fuel tank had exploded followed by the right tank 18 minutes later. The cause for the explosion was unclear, though some speculate it was an assassination attempt based on chemicals found during the subsequent investigation.

Ground transportation

Transfer to/from Suvarnabhumi Airport
Don Mueang International Airport is approximately 1–1.5 hours from Suvarnabhumi Airport by rail or bus. There are also direct buses between the airports operated by Airport Shuttle Bus.

Road
The airport has two main access routes. Among these the most convenient route is via the Don Mueang Tollway. Another main airport entrance is Vibhavadi Rangsit Road.

Four bus routes service the airport, route A1 runs between the airport and Bangkok Bus Terminal (Chatuchak), route A2 runs between the airport and Victory Monument, route A3 runs between the airport and Lumphini Park, and route A4 runs between the airport and Sanam Luang.

Rail
Don Mueang International Airport is served by the SRT Dark Red Line and the State Railway of Thailand intercity services at Don Mueang railway station that connects to central Bangkok at Krung Thep Aphiwat Central Terminal.

AOT plans to build a three-kilometre monorail to link the airport with the BTS Green Line. Approval of the three billion baht project is expected by the end of 2020.

References

External links
 
 
 Don Mueang International Airport Official site
 News video of the last two flights from Don Mueang, as telecast on MCOT

Buildings and structures in Bangkok
Airports in Thailand
Transport in Bangkok
Airports established in 1914
Tourism in Bangkok
1910s establishments in Siam
Don Mueang district